Indigenous (1993–2004) was an Irish thoroughbred racehorse who also raced in Hong Kong. 
He was bred by Major John de Burgh at his Oldtown Stud in Naas, County Kildare, Ireland and sold as a yearling for 10,500 guineas at the Goffs Orby Sale in 1994.

Purchased by trainer Kevin Prendergast, he was named "Qualtron." Racing in Ireland at age two, he won one of three starts and at age three, won two of five starts. With a record of 3-0-1 in 8 starts, he was sold to Mr. & Mrs. Pang Yuen Hing to race in Hong Kong where he was renamed Indigenous and became widely regarded as one of Hong Kong's best stayers.

The winner of a number of important races in Hong Kong, including back-to-back editions of the Hong Kong Champions & Chater Cup,  Indigenous also finished a strong second in the 1999 Japan Cup and third in the 2002 Singapore Airlines International Cup.

A gelding, after his retirement from racing on June 3, 2003, Indigenous was used at the Tuen Mun Public Riding School in Tuen Mun, New Territories where he died on August 8, 2004, following an illness.

Career stats 
In Hong Kong (inc. representing Hong Kong in foreign races): 55 starts, 12 wins
In Ireland: 8 starts, 3 wins

References
Hong Kong Jockey Club Horse Profile
Indigenous' pedigree
August 9, 2004 Racenews article titled Hong Kong Racing Legend Indigenous Passes Away at Tuen Mun

1993 racehorse births
2004 racehorse deaths
Thoroughbred family 11-d
Racehorses bred in Ireland
Racehorses trained in Ireland
Racehorses trained in Hong Kong